Maine, Wisconsin may refer to:

 Maine, Marathon County, Wisconsin, a village
 Maine, Outagamie County, Wisconsin, a town